The following highways are numbered 31D:

United States
 Nebraska Link 31D
 New York State Route 31D (former)

See also
 List of highways numbered 31D